A circular orbit is an orbit with a fixed distance around the barycenter; that is, in the shape of a circle.

Listed below is a circular orbit in astrodynamics or celestial mechanics under standard assumptions. Here the centripetal force is the gravitational force, and the axis mentioned above is the line through the center of the central mass perpendicular to the plane of motion.

In this case, not only the distance, but also the speed, angular speed, potential and kinetic energy are constant. There is no periapsis or apoapsis. This orbit has no radial version.

Circular acceleration
Transverse acceleration (perpendicular to velocity) causes change in direction. If it is constant in magnitude and changing in direction with the velocity,  circular motion ensues. Taking two derivatives of the particle's coordinates with respect to time gives the centripetal acceleration

where:
 is orbital velocity of orbiting body,
 is radius of the circle
 is angular speed, measured in radians per unit time.
The formula is dimensionless, describing a ratio true for all units of measure applied uniformly across the formula.

Velocity
The speed (or the magnitude of velocity) relative to the central object is constant:

where:
 , is the gravitational constant
 , is the mass of both orbiting bodies , although in common practice, if the greater mass is significantly larger, the lesser mass is often neglected, with minimal change in the result.
, is the standard gravitational parameter.

Equation of motion
The orbit equation in polar coordinates, which in general gives r in terms of θ, reduces to:

where:
 is specific angular momentum of the orbiting body.

This is because

Angular speed and orbital period

Hence the orbital period can be computed as:

Compare two proportional quantities, the free-fall time (time to fall to a point mass from rest)

 (17.7% of the orbital period in a circular orbit)

and the time to fall to a point mass in a radial parabolic orbit

 (7.5% of the orbital period in a circular orbit)

The fact that the formulas only differ by a constant factor is a priori clear from dimensional analysis.

Energy
The specific orbital energy is negative, and

Thus the virial theorem applies even without taking a time-average:

the kinetic energy of the system is equal to the absolute value of the total energy
the potential energy of the system is equal to twice the total energy

The escape velocity from any distance is  times the speed in a circular orbit at that distance: the kinetic energy is twice as much, hence the total energy is zero.

Delta-v to reach a circular orbit
Maneuvering into a large circular orbit, e.g. a geostationary orbit, requires a larger delta-v than an escape orbit, although the latter implies getting arbitrarily far away and having more energy than needed for the orbital speed of the circular orbit. It is also a matter of maneuvering into the orbit. See also Hohmann transfer orbit.

Orbital velocity in general relativity 
In Schwarzschild metric, the orbital velocity for a circular orbit with radius  is given by the following formula:

where  is the Schwarzschild radius of the central body.

Derivation 

The four-velocity of a body on a circular orbit is given by:

( is constant on a circular orbit, and the coordinates can be chosen so that ). The dot above a variable denotes derivation with respect to proper time .

For a massive particle, the components of the four-velocity satisfy the following equation:

We use the geodesic equation:

It gives:

From this, we get:

Substituting this into the equation for a massive particle gives:

Hence:

Assume we have an observer at radius , who is not moving with respect to the central body, that is, their four-velocity is proportional to the vector . The normalization condition implies that it is equal to:

The dot product of the four-velocities of the observer and the orbiting body equals the gamma factor for the orbiting body relative to the observer, hence:

This gives the velocity:

Or, in SI units:

See also
Elliptic orbit
List of orbits
Two-body problem

References

Orbits